William Bartholomew (1793–1867) was an English librettist, composer, and writer. He made his living as a chemist, but is best remembered as the translator/text author for the premieres of many of Felix Mendelssohn's works in England; most notably the anthem Hear My Prayer (1845) and the oratorio Elijah for its premiere at the Birmingham Triennial Music Festival in 1846. As a composer, he produced several hymns, The Nativity oratorio, and children's songs. He was married to the composer and organist Ann Mounsey. Son of Lemuel Bartholomew.

References

1793 births
1867 deaths
English composers
English oratorio and passion librettists
19th-century English people